The Society of Mary is an Anglican devotional society dedicated to and under the patronage of Mary, mother of Jesus.  As its website states, it is a group of Anglican Christians "dedicated to the Glory of God and the Holy Incarnation of Christ under the invocation of Our Lady, Help of Christians." The Anglican Society of Mary is not to be confused with the two Roman Catholic religious orders of the same name commonly called the Marists and the Marianists.

Objectives
The stated objectives of the society are:
 To love and honour Mary
 To spread devotion to her in reparation for past neglect and misunderstanding
 To take Mary as a model in purity, personal relationships and family life

Members of the society keep a rule of life that includes traditional Marian devotions (such as the Angelus and the Rosary), intercession for the faithful departed members of the society, participation in Mass on the major Marian feasts and solemnities and active engagement in apostolic work.

In localities where there are a number of members they may come together to form local organisations called "wards" or "cells".  These groups gather for prayer and fellowship.

The society's magazine, called AVE, is published twice per year.

History
The Society of Mary began in 1931 as the combination of two other societies: The Confraternity of Our Lady (formed in 1880) and the League of Our Lady (formed in 1902). The American region of the society received its independence in 1962. Although Anglican in origin there are non-Anglican members of the society and they can be found all over the world.  The main regional organisations are in England and the United States.

Major festivals of the society
February 2: Purification of St Mary the Virgin
March 25: Annunciation to the Blessed Virgin Mary
May 31: Visitation of the Blessed Virgin Mary
August 15: Saint Mary the Virgin (The Assumption)
September 8: Nativity of the Blessed Virgin Mary
October 15: Our Lady of Walsingham
November 21: Presentation of Mary
December 8: Conception of the Blessed Virgin Mary

Anglican devotional societies
Society of King Charles the Martyr
Guild of All Souls
Guild of Servants of the Sanctuary
Confraternity of the Blessed Sacrament
Society of the Companions of the Holy Cross

See also

Catholic Societies of the Church of England
Anglican Communion
Anglican Marian theology
Anglo-Catholicism
Blessed Virgin Mary
Marian antiphons
Mother of God
Our Lady of Walsingham
Our Lady of Ipswich

External links
Website of the Society of Mary, American Region
Website of the Society of Mary, English Region
The Society of Mary: The Study of a Devotional Grouping in the Episcopal Church, by Richard Cornish Martin (D.Min. dissertation, 1988).

Church of England societies and organisations
Anglicanism
Anglo-Catholicism
Anglican Mariology